San Antonio Mountain may refer to:

 San Antonio Mountain (New Mexico) in New Mexico, USA
 San Antonio Mountain (Nevada) in Nevada, USA
 San Antonio Mountain (Texas) in Texas, USA
 San Antonio Mountains in Nevada, USA